Hibbertia singularis is a species of flowering plant in the family Dilleniaceae and is endemic to New South Wales. It is a small, low-lying shrub with many stems, oblong leaves and single yellow flowers on the ends of main branches, with 22 to 25 stamens around three carpels.

Description
Flowering has been observed in January.

Taxonomy
Hibbertia singularis was first formally described in 2013 by Hellmut R. Toelken in the Journal of the Adelaide Botanic Gardens from specimens colected by James Hamlyn Willis at "Kydra Peaks" (near Cooma). The specific epithet (singularis) means "alone of its kind", referring to the species being very different from its closest relative.

Distribution
This hibbertia is only known from the area around Kydra Peaks on the Southern Tablelands of New South Wales.

References

singularis
Flora of New South Wales
Taxa named by Hellmut R. Toelken
Plants described in 2013